Sēkkilān Mādēvadigal Rāmadēva (12th century CE), known popularly by his family name as Sekkilhar (also spelled Sekkizhar), was a saint and a contemporary of Kulottunga Chola II. He compiled and wrote the Periya Puranam (Great Story or Narrative) in 4253 verses, recounting the life stories of the sixty-three Shaiva Nayanars, the devotees of Shiva. Sekkilhar himself was later canonised and his work, the Periyapuranam became the twelfth and final book of the sacred Saiva canon.

Life
Sekkilhar was born as Arulmozhithevan, meaning the one of the divine language. He was a native of Kundrathur village (a suburb of the present-day Chennai), a sub-division of Puliyur-kottam in Thondaimandalam. Sekkilhar was a child of precious genius and having noticed this, king Anapaya, that is Kulothunga Chola II appointed him as his Prime Minister on account of his talents. His life is celebrated by Umapati Sivacharya in his fourteenth century work (1313 CE) called Sekkilhar Nayanar Puranam. Sekkilhar had the title Uttama Chola Pallavan and his brother, the title Tondaiman Pallavaraiyan. Sekkilhar is also called Ganga-kula tilaka (the glory of the Ganga race) and Bagirathi-kula tilaka (the glory of the Bhagiratha race) by Umapati Sivacharya in his work, the Sekkilar Puranam. The Guru Puja festival for Sekkilhar is celebrated annually in the month of Vaigasi-Poosam (May-June).

Compilation of Periyapuranam 

Kulothunga Chola II, then a young king, was a devotee of Lord Siva at Chidambaram and continued the reconstruction of the center of Tamil Saivism that was begun by his ancestors. At the same time, he was very interested in the highly erotic Jain epic Jivaka Chintamani. Sekkilhar, upon noticing this, advised the king to instead turn his attention to the lives of the Saiva saints as described by Sundarar in his Tiruthondar Thogai.

The king thereupon invited Sekkilhar to expound the lives of the Saiva saints in a great poem. Since Sekkilhar was a scholar in both the Vedas as well as the Agamas and being a Saiva saint himself, knew about Nayanmars. He composed the Periyapuranam or the Great Narrative about the lives of the sixty three Nayanmars or saints and would himself sing it in the Thousand Pillared Hall of the Chidambaram temple and arouse the latent Chola Saiva zeal.

According to a folklore, when Sekkilhar sat pondering at Chidambaram temple as to how to begin his work, Lord Siva appeared and said his first verse should be:

Kulothunga Chola II was so moved upon hearing the Periyapuranam that he placed the poem and Sekkilhar on the royal elephant and took them out on a grand procession around the streets of Chidambaram, the king himself waved the fly-whisks and showered Sekkilhar with honors. This work is considered the most important initiative of Kulothunga Chola II's reign. Although it is only a literary embellishment of earlier hagiographies of the Saiva saints it came to be seen as the epitome of Chola literary style. Among all the hagiographic Puranas in Tamil, the Periyapuranam (or Tiruttondar Puranam) stands first. The Periyapuranam is considered a fifth Veda in the Tamil language and it immediately took its place as the twelfth and the last book in the Saiva canon.

Temples for Sekkilhar

As per an inscription from Srivanjiyam, Sekkilhar was deified and provisions were made for the worship of his idol by a person called Anapaayan. 

There are temples dedicated to Sekkilhar. These include the Kundrathur Sekkilhar Temple at Kundrathur, Chennai, and the Devakottai Nagara Sivan Kovil (also called the "Sekkilhar Kovil") in the Chettinad region of Sivagangai district in Tamil Nadu, where Saint Sekkilhar is the procession deity.

Research Centre
The Sekkilhar Research Centre conducts research on his epic Periyapuranam and the period, art, culture, civilization, rituals, socioeconomic conditions, and religion/secularism of the times and place surrounding it.

References

Shaivite religious leaders
Tamil poets
Indian male poets
Texts related to Nayanar saints
12th-century Indian poets
Poets from Tamil Nadu